"One Shot at Love" is the fourth  single released from LL Cool J's third album, Walking with a Panther.  It was released in 1989 for Def Jam Recordings and was produced by Dwayne Simon and LL Cool J.  "One Shot at Love" was a commercial disappointment as it only peaked at #68 on the Hot R&B/Hip-Hop songs chart.

Track listing

A-side
"One Shot at Love" (J.T. Smith, D.Simon, S. Ett) - 4:09

B-side
"Clap Your Hands" (J.T. Smith) - 3:37

References

1989 singles
LL Cool J songs
Songs written by LL Cool J
1989 songs
Def Jam Recordings singles
Songs written by Dwayne Simon